The Dukes of Hamilton were a junior ice hockey team that represented Hamilton, Ontario, Canada, in the Ontario Hockey League for two seasons from 1989 to 1991.

History
In October 1988, with the Toronto Marlboros losing hundreds of thousands of dollars a year, Maple Leaf Gardens Limited reached an agreement to sell the team for a reported $500,000 to a group from Hamilton. The OHL team moved to Hamilton for the 1989-90 season, becoming the Dukes of Hamilton. The name "Dukes" originated as a nickname for the Toronto team coming from its namesake, the Duke of Marlborough.

The Dukes were chosen to host the Memorial Cup their first season in Hamilton. However when the team finished last overall in the standings, the Dukes declined the automatic invite given to the hosts of the Memorial Cup tournament. The OHL sent the league finalist Kitchener Rangers instead.

The second season for the Dukes was only marginally better even after switching from the Leyden Division to the Emms Division. The Dukes qualified for the last playoff spot, but lost in four games straight. Following the 1990–91 season, the team was relocated to Guelph where it became the Guelph Storm.

Players
Three Dukes alumni went on to play brief NHL careers. Alek Stojanov played 107 games, Chris Govedaris played 45 games, and Shawn McCosh played 9 games. Also of note are Jeff Bes (Captain), Dino Felicetti, Rob Leask and Kayle Short for their careers in other professional leagues.

Bill Armstrong started the 1989–90 season playing defence for the Dukes, but two mid-season trades later he wound up playing for the Oshawa Generals, and scored the winning goal in double overtime of the Memorial Cup final, played at the Dukes' home arena, Copps Coliseum.

Yearly results

Regular season

Playoffs
1989–90: Out of playoffs. 
1990–91: Lost to Sault Ste. Marie Greyhounds 4 games to 0 in first round.

Uniforms and logos

The Dukes colours were red, white & blue. The home jerseys had a white background with red & blue trim. The road jerseys were a red background with white and blue trim. Their uniforms were similar to those worn at the time by the National Hockey League's Washington Capitals. The colour of the top of the crown on the logo was either red or white, opposite or the background of the home or away jersey.

Arena
The Dukes played their home games at Copps Coliseum, which hosted the Memorial Cup in 1990.

References

External links
Copps Coliseum The OHL Arena & Travel Guide

1989 establishments in Ontario
1991 disestablishments in Ontario
Defunct Ontario Hockey League teams
Ice hockey clubs established in 1989
Ice hockey clubs disestablished in 1991
Ice hockey teams in Hamilton, Ontario